Bridgeport is a city in Lawrence County, Illinois, United States. The population was 1,886 at the 2010 census.

History

Bridgeport was established in the mid-1850s as a stop along the Ohio and Mississippi Railway.  It was named by a railroad official for the bridge that spanned Indian Creek, in the southern part of the city.  Bridgeport incorporated in 1896.

Geography
Bridgeport lies southwest of Lawrenceville along Illinois State Route 250.

Demographics

As of the census of 2000, there were 2,168 people, 871 households, and 585 families residing in the city. The racial makeup of the city was 98.52% White, 0.46% African American, 0.09% Native American, 0.05% from other races, and 0.88% from two or more races. Hispanic or Latino of any race were 0.37% of the population.

There were 871 households, out of which 32.3% had children under the age of 18 living with them, 50.1% were married couples living together, 12.3% had a female householder with no husband present, and 32.8% were non-families. 30.0% of all households were made up of individuals, and 16.3% had someone living alone who was 65 years of age or older. The average household size was 2.42 and the average family size was 2.99.

In the city, the population was spread out, with 26.8% under the age of 18, 8.4% from 18 to 24, 27.0% from 25 to 44, 18.9% from 45 to 64, and 18.9% who were 65 years of age or older. The median age was 36 years. For every 100 females, there were 88.0 males. For every 100 females age 18 and over, there were 85.9 males.

The median income for a household in the city was $27,635, and the median income for a family was $33,333. Males had a median income of $27,235 versus $16,660 for females. The per capita income for the city was $12,960. About 13.0% of families and 17.3% of the population were below the poverty line, including 24.6% of those under age 18 and 13.9% of those age 65 or over.

Education
The Red Hill Junior Senior High School is located in Bridgeport. The school mascot is the Salukis. Prior to the 1970s, the local high school was named Bridgeport High School. Its mascot was the Bulldogs. Bridgeport High School then consolidated with the neighboring town of Sumner, and the mascot for the new consolidated school became the Salukis. There is also an elementary school in Bridgeport called BGS, or Bridgeport Grade School.

Sports
The Red Hill Junior High School Lady Salukis 2008 softball team went to the Illinois state championship and placed second.

In 1960, Bridgeport High School had a total school enrollment of only 385.  That year the boys basketball team advanced to the State of Illinois IHSA basketball tournament finals to face a much larger Chicago team, John Marshall. At the time, Illinois, like Indiana in the movie Hoosiers, held a single-class tournament where all schools competed for the same championship. Chicago Marshall's enrollment was listed at 2,333, more than six times that of Bridgeport. Unlike the Indiana team in Hoosiers, Bridgeport lost the championship game, finishing its season with a 33–2 record.

Notable people

 John Lankston, tenor with the New York City Opera and actor in Broadway musicals
 Gary Wagner, a pitcher for the Philadelphia Phillies and Boston Red Sox, was born in Bridgeport.

References

Cities in Illinois
Cities in Lawrence County, Illinois
populated places established in 1896
1896 establishments in Illinois